Pure Connie Smith is the twenty-ninth solo studio album by American country singer Connie Smith. It was released in November 1977 via Monument Records and contained ten tracks. The album was Smith's first with the Monument label. The album was recorded in a country pop production style featuring mostly new recordings. One single was released from the album, "Coming Around". The song charted the American country songs chart in 1977.

Background, recording and content
Connie Smith moved to Columbia Records in 1973 after 18 top ten Billboard country singles at the RCA Victor label in the 1960s. At Columbia, Smith had continued commercial success but with less frequency. Only two of her singles reached the country top ten, while a majority reached the top 20. Smith's final Columbia album was issued in 1976. She left the label in 1977, theorizing that her music lacked the promotion that more popular Columbia acts received like George Jones or Tammy Wynette. Instead, Smith signed with Monument Records in 1977, owned by Fred Foster. According to Smith, Foster told her that he wanted to craft her into "another Roy Orbison."

Smith's first Monument album was recorded between February and March 1977. The project was cut at both the Columbia Studio and Woodland Sound Studios, both of which were located in Nashville, Tennessee. The sessions were produced by Ray Baker. Baker had been serving as Smith's producer since 1973 and he moved forward with her to Monument. The first Monument project consisted of ten tracks. and a country pop approach that Smith was pressured into. Included was a cover of "When It's Just You and Me", which had been a top 20 country single for Dottie West. Smith also recorded new material written by songwriters (and artists) like Dallas Frazier, Don Gibson, Dave Loggins.

Release, singles and reception
Pure Connie Smith was released by Monument Records in November 1977. It was distributed as a vinyl LP, containing five songs on either side of the record. In total, it was the thirty first studio album of Smith's career. The only single included on the album was "Coming Around", which was first issued in March 1977. Spending seven weeks on the Billboard Hot Country Songs chart, it only reached number 58. It was Smith's second lowest-charting single up to that point.

The album did not initially receive much critical attention. However, years later, Monument released a compilation of Smith's material titled Greatest Hits on Monument. Two tracks from Pure Connie Smith were featured on the disc. Reviewer Stephen Thomas Erlewine commented on the music's production and theorized why the music did not get notable attention. "This is commercial music that doesn't really work. It has a state-of-the-art production that dates instantly, walks the line between crossover pop and country-pop rather clumsly, and lacks good material. Smith still sings well throughout it, but it's not a very good showcase for her talents, nor is it very good as crossover pop -- it's too square and middle of the road, making the urban cowboy bubbling up at the time seem risky and edgy," he stated.

Track listing

Personnel 
All credits are adapted from the liner notes of Pure Connie Smith.

Musical personnel

Byron Bach — Strings
George Binkley III — Strings
Kenny Buttrey — Drums
John Allan Catchings — Strings
Marvin Chantry — Strings
Roy Christensen — Strings
Virginia Christensen — Strings
Tommy Cogbill — Bass
Ray Edenton — Guitar
Johnny Gimble — Mandolin
Carl Gorodetzky — Strings
Lloyd Green — Steel guitar
Lennie Haight — Strings
George Jackson — Guitar 
Shane Keister — Piano
Shelly Kurland — Strings
The Lea Jane Singers — Background vocals
Kenny Malone — Drums
Grady Martin — Guitar 
Charlie McCoy — Harmonica
Ann R. Migliore —Strings
Bob Moore — Bass
The Nashville Edition — Background vocals
Ron Oates — Piano
Leon Rhodes — Bass
Robert Thompson — Guitar 
Steven Maxwell Smith — Strings
Jerry Stembridge — Guitar 
Samuel Terranera — Strings
Gary Vanosdale — Strings
Reggie Young — Guitar

Technical personnel

Ray Baker — Producer
Rex Collier — Engineer
Ronnie Dean — Engineer
Ken Kim — Art direction, photography
David McKinley — Engineer
Ronnie Reynolds — Engineer
Hank Williams — Engineer

Release history

References

Footnotes

Books

 

1977 albums
Albums produced by Ray Baker (music producer)
Connie Smith albums
Monument Records albums